Kenny Siegal is a Grammy-nominated music producer, songwriter, multi-instrumentalist, and recording engineer originally from Island Park, New York, who now resides in the Hudson Valley. Siegal has produced (and/or co-produced) many albums including Langhorne Slim and The Law's  The Spirit Moves, The Way We Move (prominently featured on numerous films, television shows and national commercials), and Lost at Last Volumes 1 and 2, Chris Whitley's final record Reiter In, The Wiyos Twist, Spottiswoode & His Enemies 2011 Independent Music Award-winning Wild Goosechase Expedition and This is The Town: A Tribute to Nilsson featuring Langhorne Slim, Marco Benevento, Willy Mason, Dawn Landes, Yellowbirds, Tracy Bonham and many more. Siegal created Old Soul Studios in Catskill, New York, where over 100 records have been recorded since 2001, including everything from  The New Pornographers, Ratatat, Beirut, Life In A Blender, Cuddle Magic, Phyllis Chen, Willy Mason, Nina Violet, Jemima James, Apollo Sunshine, and many more.

Two-time Independent Music Award Winner, Siegal has worked on songwriting assignments for Rick Rubin, produced tracks for Marshall Chess, Cheap Trick, has co-written with Paul Williams, and played guitar and sang on Tears for Fears' Everybody Loves a Happy Ending.  On the road, Kenny played bass and guitar with Amanda Palmer and Nervous Cabaret, and played with the Wiyos at Carnegie Hall and toured with them in the UK (playing lap steel, keys and electric guitar).

In 1995, Siegal started Johnny Society, Johnny Society's first live performance was a showcase for Ray Davies of The Kinks who heard Siegal's basement recordings and requested to see the band live. All Music said about their first record: "It Don't Matter hits with the sonic force of a tidal wave, or to use a more appropriate analogy, like a one-band, end-of-the-20th-century rock & roll beacon the likes of which hasn't been experienced since the Beatles." Johnny Society's second record 'Wood' was on music critic Ben Ratliff of The New York Times' top ten list of favorite records of 1999, praising Siegal's "unpretentious, utilitarian imagination," and "perfect little agonized rock songs." Siegal won The Independent Music Award for Best Producer (along with co-producers Bryce Goggin and Brian Geltner) for Johnny Society's 2012 release 'Free Society'  and 'Clairvoyance' won Album of the Year at the Independent Music Awards in 2002. All of the Johnny Society records have been critically hailed, earning Siegal comparisons to John Lennon, Bowie, Cheap Trick and The Lovin' Spoonful. Siegal's only solo record, 'Eleccentricity' was nominated for IMA Eclectic album of the year (2010). 'Eleccentricity' also features such guests as Siegal's wife, Gwen Snyder Siegal (aka Blueberry), Joseph Arthur, Trixie Whitley, and Nina Violet.

Kenny co-produced, engineered, performed on, and added some co-writing to Lucky Diaz and The Family Jam Band’s “Crayon Kids” album which was nominated for Best Children’s Music Album at the 64th annual Grammys (2022). His daughter Phoebe also sang backing vocals on every song on the record.

References

Year of birth missing (living people)
Living people
Record producers from New York (state)